Nicolas Borodine (born 5 April 1994) is a French professional footballer who plays as a midfielder for Championnat National 2 club Épinal.

Career
A product of AC Ajaccio's youth system, he made his senior debut on 6 November 2015, coming on as a substitute for Mouaad Madri in the 2–0 win against Bourg-en-Bresse at the Stade François Coty.

Personal life
Born in France, Borodine is of Russian descent through his great-grandfather. His nickname is "Le Kosovar" (The Kosovar), due to his beard.

References

External links
 Nicolas Borodine at foot-national.com
 
 
 

1994 births
Living people
Footballers from Lyon
French footballers
French people of Russian descent
Association football midfielders
AC Ajaccio players
AS Saint-Priest players
SAS Épinal players
Ligue 2 players
Championnat National 2 players
Championnat National 3 players